Lars Kindt Hendriksen (born 16 January 1966) is a Danish former sailor. He competed in the Tornado event at the 1992 Summer Olympics.

References

External links
 

1966 births
Living people
Danish male sailors (sport)
Olympic sailors of Denmark
Sailors at the 1992 Summer Olympics – Tornado
People from Egedal Municipality
Sportspeople from the Capital Region of Denmark